Amanda Catherine Crew (born June 5, 1986) is a Canadian actress. After making her film debut in Final Destination 3 (2006), she had lead roles as Felicia Alpine in Sex Drive (2008), Tess Carroll in Charlie St. Cloud (2010), and Carrie Miller on the CTV series Whistler (2006–2008). She is best known for her role as venture capitalist Monica Hall on the HBO series Silicon Valley (2014–2019).

Early life
Amanda Crew was born in Langley, British Columbia. Her mother, Debbie Crew, is a legal secretary and her father, Ian Crew, is a telecom worker. She began acting when she was cast in the musical Dragon Tales in grade five. This led to talent-agency representation and doing commercials. She went on to the American Academy of Dramatic Arts in New York City. Since October 2010, she has been in a long-term relationship with actor Dustin Milligan.

Career

2005–2013
In 2005, at age 19, Crew landed her first onscreen acting role as Polly Brewer in the ABC teen drama Life as We Know It. She made a cameo appearance as a sorority sister in an episode of Smallville, a television series based on the DC Comics character Superman. From 2005 to 2006, she played Tanis McTaggart on the YTV teen drama 15/Love which co-starred actress and close friend Meaghan Rath. From 2006 to 2008, Crew played Carrie Miller on the CTV drama Whistler, for which she earned her first Leo award.

In 2006, she made her film debut in the supernatural horror film Final Destination 3, the third installment in the Final Destination film series and the fourth chronologically. She played Julie Christensen, the younger sister of the film's protagonist Wendy. Crew had originally auditioned for the role of Erin Ulmer while Alexz Johnson auditioned for Julie, but ended up switching roles prior to filming. Despite mixed reviews from critics, the film was a commercial success, earning over $117 million at the box office worldwide. She made a cameo as a high school student in the romantic teen comedy John Tucker Must Die, which was negatively received.

She later appeared in the romantic teen comedy She's the Man, a modern adaptation of William Shakespeare's Twelfth Night. She played Kia, a soccer player who helps her friend Viola Hastings (played by Amanda Bynes) pretend to be her brother in order to play on the boys' soccer team after their team gets cut by their misogynistic coach. In 2008, Crew landed her first lead role in the teen road comedy Sex Drive. She played Felicia Alpine, a high school student who goes on a road trip with her two best friends (played by Josh Zuckerman and Clark Duke).

She later starred as Marie in the romantic comedy That One Night, which premiered at the Omaha Film Festival on February 19, 2008. In 2009, she had a supporting role with Martin Donovan and Kyle Gallner in the supernatural horror film The Haunting in Connecticut. Despite negative reviews from critics, the film opened in second place at the North American box office and eventually grossed $77.5 million worldwide. She starred in the romantic comedy The Break-Up Artist as Britney, a breakup artist who becomes a matchmaker after her ex-boyfriend starts his own breakup company and steals her customers.

In 2010, Crew co-starred with Zac Efron and Kim Basinger in the supernatural romantic drama Charlie St. Cloud, playing the love interest of the titular character. Despite negative reviews, it proved to be Crew's mainstream breakthrough. Later that year, she starred in the sci-fi crime thriller Repeaters as Sonia Logan, a drug addict who becomes trapped in a time loop. The film premiered at the 2010 Toronto International Film Festival on September 13 and received negative reviews from critics. Despite this, the film was nominated for nine Leo Awards, including Best Lead Performance by a Female in a Motion Picture for Crew and Best Feature Length Film, losing the latter to Gunless.

In 2011, Crew starred in the crime thriller Charlie Zone as a heroin addicted single mother. After the film had its world premiere at the Atlantic Film Festival on September 16, 2011, the film was screened at the Vancouver International Film Festival on October 10, 2012, and later received a limited theatrical release on March 1, 2013. She later starred in the family drama Sisters & Brothers as Nikki, an aspiring actress who comes into conflict with her older half-sister. The film won six Leo Awards, including Best Feature Length Film, and Best Lead Performance by a Female in a Motion Picture for Crew.

Crew guest-starred on the USA Network legal drama Suits, as an expert hacker who has stolen money from her father's company. In 2012, Crew co-starred with an ensemble cast in the political thriller Knife Fight. She plays a woman involved in an affair with Larry Becker (played by Eric McCormack). The film premiered at the Tribeca Film Festival on April 25, 2012. In 2013, Crew co-starred with Kim Coates and Katie Boland in the thriller Ferocious. She played Leigh Parrish, a small-town girl turned famous actress who goes to great lengths to keep her reputation from being destroyed. Despite negative reviews, Crew received her fourth Leo nomination for her performance.

She later reunited with The Haunting in Connecticut co-star Virginia Madsen in the romantic comedy drama Crazy Kind of Love. She played Bette Mack, a woman who becomes intimately involved with the youngest son of a family nearly torn apart by the father's infidelity. She had a supporting role in the biopic Jobs, playing a hippie college student who has a one-night stand with Apple Inc. co-founder Steve Jobs (played by Ashton Kutcher). The film premiered at the 2013 Sundance Film Festival on January 25 and was critically panned.

2014–2019
From 2014 to 2019, Crew starred as venture capitalist Monica Hall in the HBO comedy series Silicon Valley, created by Mike Judge. In the first season, her character was originally an assistant to Peter Gregory (played by Christopher Evan Welch), but in the second season she becomes an associate partner with Laurie Bream (played by Suzanne Cryer) after Welch's death in 2013, and later leaves Bream Hall to join Pied Piper as its CFO and business advisor. She guest-starred on the second season of the CTV police procedural drama series Motive as Robin Keaton, a young widowed mother who becomes engaged unknowingly to the man responsible for the murder of her son's father.

She later co-starred with Brian Geraghty in the Christian musical drama The Identical, playing a couple who gives one of their newborn twin sons to a sterile couple (played by Ray Liotta and Ashley Judd, respectively) as they cannot raise them both. The film premiered at the Nashville Film Festival on April 17, 2014 to negative reviews and was a box office bomb. In her third collaboration with director Carl Bessai, she starred as seductive librarian Izzy Fontaine in the crime comedy Bad City, which premiered at the Oldenburg International Film Festival on September 10, 2014. The film was nominated for nine Leo Awards, including Best Feature Length Drama and Best Supporting Performance by a Female in a Motion Picture for Crew.

In 2015, she co-starred with Blake Lively and Ellen Burstyn in the fantasy romance The Age of Adaline, playing the college student daughter of William and Kathy Jones (played by Harrison Ford and Kathy Baker, respectively). Crew co-starred with musical duo Aly & AJ in the comedy drama Weepah Way for Now, which premiered at the Los Angeles Film Festival on June 16, 2015. In 2016, Crew starred in the biographical sports drama Race, playing the love interest of track and field coach Larry Snyder (played by Jason Sudeikis). The film received seven nominations at the 5th Canadian Screen Awards, including Best Motion Picture. She co-starred with Michael Shannon in the western drama Poor Boy, playing a roller girl who moonlights as a prostitute. The film premiered at the Tribeca Film Festival on April 17, 2016.

She later reunited with Ferocious co-star Michael Eklund in the romantic sports comedy Chokeslam. She played Sheena DeWilde, an ill-tempered wrestler who is romantically pursued by her ex-boyfriend Corey Swanson (played by Chris Marquette) despite being intimately involved with her manager Tab Hennessey (played by Niall Matter). After the film premiered at the Calgary International Film Festival on October 2, 2016, it was released on February 10, 2017 to mixed reviews from critics. In 2017, Crew starred in the critically panned romantic wedding comedy Table 19. She played Nikki, the maid of honor at a wedding and the narcissistic girlfriend of the wedding's best man Teddy (played by Wyatt Russell).

She later co-starred with Ed Harris in the drama thriller A Crooked Somebody, playing a woman whose father was murdered when she was a child. The film premiered at the Los Angeles Film Festival on June 21, 2017, and was released in theaters on October 5, 2018 to critical acclaim. She co-starred with Stephen McHattie in the crime drama Juggernaut, playing a woman caught in the middle of a family conflict between her boyfriend Dean Gamble (played by David Cubitt) and his outlaw younger brother Saxon (played by Jack Kesy). The film premiered at the San Diego International Film Festival on October 7, 2017.

In 2018, Crew co-starred with Emile Hirsch and Bruce Dern in the science fiction thriller Freaks, playing the imprisoned mother of a young girl with telekinetic abilities. The film had its world premiere in the Discovery section at the Toronto International Film Festival on September 8, 2018, where it was nominated for Best Canadian Film, and was released worldwide on September 13, 2019. She co-starred with Adam Brody in the horror film Isabelle, playing a woman who begins seeing a supernatural entity following the death of her stillborn son. The film had its world premiere in the Midnight Passion section at the 23rd Busan International Film Festival on October 6, 2018. In spite of the film being panned by critics, Crew was nominated for the Best Actress award at several film festivals for her performance. In 2019, she starred in the home invasion horror comedy Tone-Deaf. She played Olive Smith, an entitled and obnoxious millennial who, after several failed relationships and being fired from her job, decides to flee to the countryside and rent a house from widowed baby-boomer Harvey Parker (played by Robert Patrick, who was also one of the film's executive producers). The film had its world premiere at the SXSW Festival on March 10, 2019 and was released worldwide on August 23. Reviews for the film were predominantly mixed, though Crew's performance was praised.

2020–present

In 2020, she appeared in the biographical crime thriller Target Number One. She played Anna Malarek, the wife of journalist Victor Malarek (played by Josh Hartnett). The film was released on July 10, 2020 to positive reviews from critics. Crew starred opposite Alisha Wainwright in the horror television film There's Something Wrong with the Children. She played the mother of the titular children who begin exhibiting disturbing behavior after disappearing in the woods. The film premiered on January 17, 2023 on Epix and received positive reviews. She will star opposite Tom Felton and Ashley Greene in the thriller Some Other Woman.

Filmography

Film

Television

Web series

Music video

As a director

Awards and nominations

References

External links

1986 births
Living people
21st-century Canadian actresses
Actresses from British Columbia
American Academy of Dramatic Arts alumni
Canadian expatriate actresses in the United States
Canadian film actresses
Canadian television actresses
People from Langley, British Columbia (city)